Elatine is one of only two genera in the plant family Elatinaceae, the waterwort family. It contains about 25 species of aquatic plants known generally as waterworts. These are annual or perennial plants found in wet areas worldwide.

, Plants of the World Online accepted the following species:

Elatine alsinastrum L.
Elatine ambigua Wight - Asian waterwort
Elatine americana (Pursh) Arn. - American waterwort
Elatine brachysperma A.Gray - shortseed waterwort
Elatine brochonii Clavaud
Elatine californica A.Gray - California waterwort
Elatine campylosperma Seub.
Elatine chilensis Gay - Chilean waterwort
Elatine ecuadoriensis Molau
Elatine fassettiana Steyerm.
Elatine fauquei Monod
Elatine glaziovii Nied.
Elatine gratioloides A.Cunn.
Elatine gussonei (Sommier) Brullo, Lanfr., Pavone & Ronsisv.
Elatine heterandra H.Mason - mosquito waterwort
Elatine hexandra (Lapierre) DC. - six-stamen waterwort
Elatine hungarica Moesz
Elatine hydropiper L. - eight-stamen waterwort
Elatine lindbergii Rohrb.
Elatine lorentziana Hunz.
Elatine macrocalyx Albr.
Elatine macropoda Guss.
Elatine madagascariensis H.Perrier
Elatine minima (Nutt.) Fisch. & C.A.Mey. - small waterwort
Elatine ojibwayensis Garneau
Elatine paramoana Schmidt-M. & Bernal
Elatine peruviana Baehni & J.F.Macbr.
Elatine rubella Rydb. - southwestern waterwort
Elatine spathulata Gorski
Elatine triandra Schkuhr - three-stamen waterwort

References

External links
 Jepson Manual Treatment

Elatinaceae
Malpighiales genera